Barry Myers (1 June 1937 – 17 August 2016) was an English advertising filmmaker.

Early life
He was born in Hampstead. He attended King's College School in Wimbledon, then studied French and German at Brasenose College, Oxford.

Career
After working in agencies as copywriter on commercial scripts, Barry moved on to directing his own scripts. He then started his own company, Spots. During the following years of its existence, Spots grew to be one of the world's top production companies, with offices in London, Los Angeles, New York and Paris, winning Gold in every major festival around the world.

He produced the Cadbury Finger of Fudge advert for Cadbury Fudge, with music from The Lincolnshire Poacher written by Mike d'Abo, and the Cadbury Flake advert with a young female in a field.

Personal life
He died on 17 August 2016.

Filmography
Noteworthy commercials

 1978 : Olympus (Snapshot)
 1978 : Tefal (Tefal Superfryers - Gas Masks)
 1979 : Lustucru (L'oeuf fêlé 2)
 1984 : Barclays (Mr Grey)
 1984 : Radio Rentals (Love Scene)
 1985 : Public Information Film (Smoker of the Future) 
 1985 : Hovis ('Watermill)
 1988 : British Airways 1989 : Volkswagen Golf (Le père et l'enfant)
 1990 : Barilla (Le Museé et Sauces Toscanes)
 1990 : Citroën ('Spike')
 1993 : Renault Clio ("Le Paradis communiste" et "L'Héritier")
 1995 : Smirnoff ("People's Army")
 1996 : Axe ("Jalousie")
 1997 : Mars ("Cyber")
 1998 : Schweppes ("Fièvre de la jungle")
 1999 : Mars ("L'indien")
 2000 : McDonald's ("Traffic Jam")
 2004 : William Lawson's'' ("Sharon Stone")

External links

References

1937 births
2016 deaths
Alumni of Brasenose College, Oxford
Artists from London
English film directors
People educated at King's College School, London
People from Hampstead